Five Canyons Open Space (FCOS) is located in Castro Valley, in Alameda County, California. Five Canyons is a multi-agency collaboration between East Bay Regional Parks District (EBRPD), Alameda County Public Works, Hayward Area Recreation and Parks District (HARD), and several homeowners associations. EBRPD is the lead agency for this open space. The main visitors are hikers, bicyclists, equestrians and dog walkers. Restrooms and drinking water are available at HARD's nearby Five Canyons Park. 

FCOS is open daily from 8:00 AM until dusk. There are no fees for parking or for dogs. There are no wheelchair-accessible facilities, no restrooms, no drinking water, no picnic facilities, and no reservable campgrounds.

The Bay Area Ridge Trail connects FCOS to Cull Canyon Regional Recreation Area to the north and Don Castro Regional Recreation Area to the west. At some future time, the trail will also connect to Garin Regional Park, Dry Creek Regional Park and Mission Peak Regional Preserve.

References 

Parks in Alameda County, California